Phrixosceles hydrocosma is a moth of the family Gracillariidae. It is known from Meghalaya, India.

References

Gracillariinae
Moths of Asia
Moths described in 1908